Balaiym Tuğanbaiqyzy Kesebaeva (born 23 April 1966) is a Kazakh politician and jurist who's serving as the Deputy Chair of the Mazhilis since 15 January 2021 and a member of the Mazhilis from March 2016.

Biography

Early life and career 
Kesebaeva was born in the village of Jambyl in Turkistan Region. She received her education from Taldykorgan Law College, Al-Farabi Kazakh National University, and Korkyt Ata Kyzylorda University where she earned her bachelors.

From 1985 to 1988, she worked as the head of the Office of the Department of Justice of the Chimkent Regional Executive Committee. In 1993, Kesebaeva was appointed as a clerk of the Shaha Architectural and Design Cooperative in Almaty and then from 1994 to 1998, she served as a counselor, chief counselor, chief specialist, and head of Department of the Ministry of Justice. In 1999, she became the deputy head in Kyzylorda Regional Department of Justice then in 2002 as the Head of the Mangystau Regional Department of Justice. From 2004, Kesebaeva worked as director of the Department of Internal Administration of the Ministry of Justice until becoming the Kyzylorda Regional Department of Justice head again in 2009.

Political career 
In 2016, Kesebaeva was candidate for the Nur Otan party in the legislative elections and became a Mazhilis member following the results on 24 March 2016. From there, she served as member of the Committee on Legislation and Judicial and Legal Reform. She ran for reelection in 2021 after winning the party's primaries where she was at the following opening session of the 7th Mazhilis on 15 January 2021 elected as the Deputy Chair of the Mazhilis.

References 

Living people
People from Turkistan Region
1966 births
Kazakhstani jurists
Al-Farabi Kazakh National University alumni
Nur Otan politicians
Members of the Mazhilis